Jostedalsbreen National Park is a national park in Norway that encompasses the largest glacier on the European mainland, Jostedalsbreen. The park was established by royal decree on 25 October 1991, and then in 1998, it was enlarged to the northwest.

Location
The park lies in the municipalities of Luster, Sogndal, Gloppen, Sunnfjord, and Stryn, all of which are in Vestland county. There are three museums and also visitors centers: the Breheimsenteret in Jostedalen, Jostedalsbreen nasjonalparksenter in Oppstryn (Stryn Municipality) and Norsk bremuseum in Fjærland (Sogndal Municipality).

Topography
The glacier has shrunk in recent years, and there are ruins of farms that were overtaken by the glacier in 1750.

Name
The park was named after the main glacier in it, Jostedalsbreen.  The first element of that name is the name of the old municipality Jostedal, the last element is the finite form of the word bre which means "glacier".

See also
List of glaciers in Norway

References

External links

 Map of Jostedalsbreen National Park
 Hiking in Jostedalsbreen National Park

1991 establishments in Norway
National parks of Norway
Protected areas established in 1991
Protected areas of Vestland
Tourist attractions in Vestland
Luster, Norway
Stryn
Sogndal
Gloppen
Sunnfjord